Meshgin-e Sharqi District is in Meshgin Shahr County, Ardabil province, Iran. At the 2006 census, its population was 17,627 in 4,467 households. The following census in 2011 counted 14,322 people in 4,343 households. At the latest census in 2016, the district had 12,663 inhabitants living in 4,479 households.

References 

Meshgin Shahr County

Districts of Ardabil Province

Populated places in Ardabil Province

Populated places in Meshgin Shahr County